Paul Luft (born 1934) is a German Islamic studies scholar and Emeritus Professor at Durham University where he is Honorary Research Fellow in the School of Government and International Affairs and Honorary Lecturer in the Institute for Middle Eastern and Islamic Studies. From 1977 to 1980, he was a fellow of the German Historical Institute.

Works
Luft, J.P. & Turner, Colin. (2008). Shi'ism: Critical Concepts in Islamic Studies. London: Routledge
Luft, J.P. (2000). Die Islamische Revolution 1979. In Grosse Revolution der Geschicte. Wende, Peter. Meunchen
Luft, J.P. (1994). Gottesstaat und hoefische Gesellschaft. In Asien in der Neuzeit, 1500-1950. Dabringhaus, Sabine, Freitag, Ulrike & Air, Paul Frankfurt
Luft, J.P. (1986). The Persian Railway Syndicate and British Railway Policy in Iran. In The Gulf in the Early 20th Century. Lawless, R.I.

References

Living people
1934 births
British Islamic studies scholars
University of Göttingen alumni
Academics of Durham University
Free University of Berlin alumni
German Islamic studies scholars